Anson Coleman Allen (February 25, 1838 – March 23, 1880) was an American businessman and politician.

Born in Rochester, New York, Allen settled in Milwaukee, Wisconsin and was in the transportation and forwarding business between the western and eastern sections of the United States. He served in the Wisconsin State Assembly in 1879 as a Republican. He died in Milwaukee, Wisconsin.

Notes

1838 births
1880 deaths
Businesspeople from Rochester, New York
Politicians from Milwaukee
Businesspeople from Wisconsin
Republican Party members of the Wisconsin State Assembly
19th-century American politicians
Politicians from Rochester, New York
19th-century American businesspeople